Tom Manning is a fictional character from Dark Horse Comics' Hellboy universe. He is director of the Bureau of Paranormal Research and Defense.

Character overview
Manning has classically been portrayed as a stuffed-shirt bureaucrat who refuses to trust the paranormal members of his agency, even though their presence is critical to the successful defense of the planet. In recent years, Manning has softened his approach to his superhumans; Roger the Homunculus, for example, was promoted to leader of his own squad even though Manning, at one point, had a bomb placed in Roger's chest as a precautionary measure.

Manning, perhaps smarting from the defection of Hellboy from the Bureau, recently refused to accept the resignation of Captain Ben Daimio after a disaster that claimed Roger and his team. In this way, Manning has developed from a cold administrator to a leader that places the needs of his agents over the needs of the Bureau.

In other media
In the film series, much like in the original graphic novel, Tom Manning (played by Jeffrey Tambor) is more of a bureaucrat and politician than supernatural investigator. He is also instrumental in debunking the conspiracy theories which surround the agency and the involvement of the FBI. In Hellboy, Manning holds a tense working relationship with Hellboy until Hellboy saves Manning's life, after which the two share a bonding moment in which Manning teaches Hellboy how to properly light up a cigar. Their tension is renewed, however, in Hellboy II: The Golden Army, in which Hellboy's actions result in the outing of the BPRD's existence and Manning being replaced by Johann Krauss as Hellboy's superior. 
Manning also appears in Hellboy Animated: Blood & Iron in a small role, voiced by Jim Cummings.

Characters created by Mike Mignola
Dark Horse Comics film characters
Hellboy characters
Comics characters introduced in 1994
Fictional Federal Bureau of Investigation personnel